Endurance: Shackleton's Incredible Voyage, is a 1959 book written by Alfred Lansing, about the failure of the Imperial Trans-Antarctic Expedition led by Sir Ernest Shackleton, in its attempt to cross the Antarctic continent in 1914.

Synopsis
The book details the almost two-year struggle for survival endured by the twenty-eight man crew of the ship Endurance. The ship was beset and eventually crushed by ice floes in the Weddell Sea, leaving the men stranded on the pack ice. All in all, the crew drifted on the ice for just over a year. They were able to launch their boats and somehow managed to land them safely on Elephant Island. Shackleton then led a crew of five aboard the James Caird through the Drake Passage, and miraculously reached South Georgia Island 650 nautical miles away. He then took two of those men on the first successful overland crossing of the island. Three months later, he was finally able to rescue the remaining crew members they had left behind on Elephant Island.

Development
Virtually every diary kept during the expedition was made available to the author, and almost all the surviving members at the time of writing submitted to lengthy interviews. The most significant contribution came from Dr. Alexander Macklin, one of the ship's surgeons, who provided Lansing with many diaries, a detailed account of the perilous journey the crew made to Elephant Island, and months of advice.

Publication history

Lansing, Alfred. (1999) 2nd ed. Endurance: Shackleton's Incredible Voyage. Carroll & Graf Publishers.

Accuracy
The carpenter, Harry McNish, was a crucial part of the expedition and a member of the six men crew that sailed to South Georgia for help. Lansing consistently calls him “old McNish”, giving his age at the start of the expedition, in 1914, to be 56 years. Some months later it is informed to be 57. Lansing also states that McNish was more than twice the average age of the rest of the crew. However, McNish was 40 years old when the expedition started. Five of the Personnel of the Imperial Trans-Antarctic Expedition were older, including Shackleton. The average age was 31.

See also
 South
 The Pale Beyond, a video game that used Endurance as inspiration

References

Further reading
 Pritchett, V., & Lansing, A. (1959). “Review”. Scientific American, 201(1), pp. 167–168. Retrieved January 29, 2020.

Imperial Trans-Antarctic Expedition
1959 non-fiction books
Hodder & Stoughton books
British travel books
English non-fiction books
American travel books
Books about Antarctica